Shan Wells is a North American sculptor, filmmaker and illustrator. He attended Art Center College of Design in California and the University of Canterbury in New Zealand, where he studied under Andrew Drummond and completed a Master of Fine Arts in 1998.

Wells illustrated a weekly political cartoon for the Durango Telegraph, an independent weekly newspaper in Durango, Colorado, from 2002 to 2021. Wells retired from political illustration after 19 years citing the need for white men to "shut up and listen," and the lack of input from "underrepresented voices" in U.S. political discourse. Wells also blogged as a cartoonist for the Huffington Post from 2009 to 2016. 

Wells is the videographer for Fort Lewis College.

Awards and grants 
 2003 Colorado Council on the Arts Fellowship- Sculpture
 2002 Fort Collins Museum of Contemporary Art Biennial Award
 2000 Colorado Council on the Arts Fellowship-Drawing
 1999 Pollock Krasner Foundation Grant

Important works

Political cartoons

References

External links
 http://www.shanwells.com
 http://www.huffingtonpost.com/shan-wells/

American sculptors
Living people
American cartoonists
University of Canterbury alumni
1967 births
Art Center College of Design people